Cyphacanthus is a genus of flowering plants belonging to the family Acanthaceae.

Its native range is Colombia.

Species:
 Cyphacanthus atopus Leonard

References

Acanthaceae
Acanthaceae genera